Lady Justice is a -tall,  Lady Justice statue in Salem, Oregon, United States. Formerly located on the roof of the Marion County Courthouse, the sculpture is now installed in Willamette University's Truman Wesley Collins Legal Center. The Willamette University College of Law received the statue when the Marion County Courthouse was demolished to make way for a new one.

References

Allegorical sculptures in Oregon
Buildings and structures in Salem, Oregon
Sculptures of women in Oregon
Willamette University campus
Willamette University College of Law